Ian Sinclair (born 1929) is an Australian politician.

Ian Sinclair may also refer to:

 Ian David Sinclair (1913–2006), Canadian businessman and senator
 Ian Sinclair (cricketer) (born 1933), New Zealand cricketer
 Ian Sinclair (broadcaster), New Zealand television journalist and reporter
 Ian Sinclair (Canadian football) (born 1960), Canadian football player
 Ian Sinclair (voice actor) (born 1984), American voice actor
 Sir Ian Sinclair (lawyer) (1926–2013), British international lawyer
 Iain Sinclair (born 1943), British writer
 Iain Sinclair (rugby union) (born 1976), Scottish rugby union player